Kinistin 91A is an Indian reserve of the Kinistin Saulteaux Nation in Saskatchewan.

References

Indian reserves in Saskatchewan